Gustaf Nilsson (20 October 1922 – 2004) was a Swedish footballer who played as a midfielder.

References

External links

1922 births
2004 deaths
Association football forwards
Swedish footballers
Sweden international footballers
Allsvenskan players
Malmö FF players